Ern or ERN may refer to:

Transport 
 Eirunepé Airport, in Brazil
 Engenho da Rainha Station, on the Rio de Janeiro Metro
 Ernakulam Town railway station, in Kerala, India
 Ernest Airlines, an Italian airline

Other uses 
 Ern (given name)
 Employer Reference Number
 Erin Energy Corporation, an American oil and gas company
 Eritrean nakfa,  the currency of Eritrea
 Error-related negativity
 Sea eagle, any bird of prey in the genus Haliaeetus
 White-tailed eagle (H. albicilla)

See also
 Erne (disambiguation)